Melissa Reeves (née Brennan; born March 14, 1967) is an American actress, best known for playing Jennifer Horton on the NBC series Days of Our Lives on-and-off for a total of 26 years (1985–1995, 2000–2006, 2010–2020).

Personal life
Reeves was born in Eatontown, New Jersey. Since March 1990, she has been married to soap opera actor and country music singer Scott Reeves. They have 2 children: Emily Taylor Reeves (born June 23, 1992) and Lawrence "Larry" David Reeves (born August 4, 1997).

Career
Among Reeves' early film roles was the thriller Summer Camp Nightmare (1987). Her first television role was as Jade Perkins on Santa Barbara from 1984 to 1985. She originated the role of the adult Jennifer Horton (later Jennifer Deveraux) on Days of Our Lives in 1985 (prior to which the character had been a child played by a young actress), and remained in the role until 1995. Reeves abruptly left Days during the show's thirtieth anniversary season, and Corday Productions and Sony TV Entertainment sued her for breach of contract. The matter was settled out-of-court with Reeves paying an unspecified sum, which Days Executive Producer Ken Corday donated to pediatric AIDS research. The role of Jennifer had quickly been recast with actress Stephanie Cameron, who remained on the show until 1998.

In 1999, Melissa and Scott Reeves starred in the made-for-TV movie Half a Dozen Babies.

In 2000, Reeves returned to Days of Our Lives in the role of Jennifer Horton. After leaving the show for the second time in 2006, she and her family moved to Tennessee.

Reeves returned to Days of Our Lives on June 9, 2010 for a one-month guest stint and subsequently became a regular cast member again in November of that year. On September 15, 2020, it was announced that Reeves had opted not to return to the role when filming began again after a hiatus brought on by the COVID-19 pandemic, and the role would be recast. This followed criticism she received from some fans, as well as her co-star Linsey Godfrey, for 'liking' social media posts by conservative commentator Candace Owens which denounced the Black Lives Matter movement. Reeves had previously drawn criticism in 2012 for expressing support for fast-food chain Chick-fil-A during a controversy over its Chief Operating Officer declaring the chain's stance against same-sex marriage.

Filmography

Awards and nominations
Daytime Emmy Awards
1992: Nominated, "Outstanding Younger Actress in a Drama Series" - Days of Our Lives
2016: Nominated, "Outstanding Supporting Actress in a Drama Series" - Days of Our Lives

Soap Opera Digest Awards
1991: Won, "Outstanding Daytime Super Couple" - Days of Our Lives (shared w/Matthew Ashford)
1992: Won, "Best Daytime Wedding" - Days of Our Lives (shared w/Matthew Ashford)
1992: Won, "Best Prime time or Daytime Love Story" - Days of Our Lives (shared w/Matthew Ashford)
1994: Won, "Hottest Female Star" - Days of Our Lives

Young Artist Awards
1985: Nominated, "Best Young Actress in a Daytime or Nighttime Television Series" - Santa Barbara
1986: Nominated, "Best Young Actress in a Daytime or Nighttime Television Series" - Santa Barbara
1987: Nominated, "Exceptional Performance by a Young Actor in a Daytime Series" - Days of Our Lives
1988: Nominated, "Best Young Actress Starring in a Television Drama Series" - Days of Our Lives

See also
Days of Our Lives
Jack Deveraux and Jennifer Horton

References

External links

1967 births
Living people
20th-century American actresses
21st-century American actresses
Actresses from New Jersey
American child actresses
American soap opera actresses
American television actresses
People from Eatontown, New Jersey